To help coordinate efforts in dealing with issues on the continent 
the Pan-African Parliament created ten permanent committees:

Committee on Rural Economy, Agriculture, Natural Resources and Environment
Committee on Monetary and Financial Affairs
Committee on Trade, Customs and Immigration Matters
Committee on Cooperation, International Relations and Conflict Resolutions
Committee on Transport, Industry, Communications, Energy, Science and Technology
Committee on Health, Labour and Social Affairs
Committee on Education, Culture, Tourism and Human Resources
Committee on Gender, Family, Youths and People with Disabilities
Committee on Justice and Human Rights
Committee on Rules, Privileges and Discipline.

External links
Committees.aspx Permanent Committees of the Pan-African Parliament